(),   or   (Finnish for 'male grandparent', 'grandfather', 'old man'), parallel to Uku in Estonian mythology, is the god of the sky, weather, harvest and thunder in Finnish mythology.

Others believe that 's original name was Baltic Perkūnas.

 is held the most significant god of Finnish mythology, although it is disputed by scholars whether this is accountable to later Christian influence. In the folk poems and prayers he is also given the epithet  ('Supreme God'), probably in reference to his status as the most highly regarded god and on the other hand his traditional domain in the heavens. Other names for  include  ('long'),  ('father'),  (archaic form of the above, modern meaning 'great', 'big' or 'large'). Although portrayed active in myth, when appealed to  makes all his appearances in legend solely by natural phenomena.

Origins

It is possible that when  took the position of the preceding sky god , 's destiny was to become a mortal smith-hero. Stories tell about  vaulting the sky-dome. Whether  was an earlier, assumably Finnic sky deity is regardless highly questionable. Some researchers hold  and  equivalent.

The Sami worshipped a similar deity, called Aijeke, probably as result of cultural cross-contamination or common origin. The god was equated with Horagalles.

Finnish folklore

 possessed a weapon, often a hammer called  (Ukko's hammer), sometimes also an axe or a sword, by which he struck lightning (see thunderbolt). 's weapon was largely comparable to the Norse Mjölnir, and Iron Age emblematic pendants depicting hammers and axes similar or identical to Scandinavian specimens have been unearthed in Finland.

This arrow is God's own. The Doom-God leads. The name  was also used of Neolithic stone tools such as battle axes, which were employed as thunderstones to be buried at the corners of dwellings

Thunderstorms were sometimes interpreted as result of  copulating with his wife  . He also was believed to cause thunderstorms by driving his chariot through the skies.

A viper with a serrated line on its back was considered a symbol of thunder. Neolithic stone carvings have been found in Russian Karelia which have features of both snakes and lightning. Evidence for worship of snakes is found among different cultures around the Baltic, including the Estonians and Finns.

, a vaguely defined being has been hypothesised to be cognate to Germanic words for the rowan tree through .

Festivals dedicated to Ukko

This tradition carried to the 19th century.

During s it was customary to consume or otherwise offer a container or some other vessel of an alcoholic beverage or food as sacrifice. It appears that often the festival was held in the community's sacred grove or  where an animal sacrifice was sometimes also performed as part of the same festival. This ceremony was believed to guarantee good weather for the coming year and thus a good harvest.

It appears that the  tradition was rather lively. The last uncontested reports of s being held originate in the 19th century, although sporadic reports also surface in the 20th century. The festival is also mentioned by the Finnish reformer  in his account of what from his point of view was Finnish idolatry.

Eponymy
A number of toponyms in Finland and surrounding regions contain some form of the name Ukko.

Finland
, Lake Inari, Finnish Lapland

Modern influence

The Weather Channel list of winter storms for 2012 list  as one of the alphabetic names they used.

See also
Animism
Finnish paganism

Sky deity

2020 Ukko

Notes

References

Estonian gods
Finnish gods
Baltic gods
Sky and weather gods
Agricultural gods
Thunder gods
Characters in the Kalevala